William Screven (c. 1629 – 1713) was a 17th-century Reformed Baptist church planter and preacher from England who founded the first Baptist church in the South.

William Augustine Screven was born in  the town of Somerton in Somerset, England in 1629, and emigrated to New England in the 1640s. In the 1670s, Screven was baptized at the First Baptist Church in Boston by John Myles, pastor of the First Baptist Church in Swansea, who was also serving as pastor of the nearby Boston church during King Philip's War.

Screven was ordained in January 1682 by the First Baptist Church of Boston, so that he might establish a church in Kittery, Maine, which he did on September 25 of that year. In 1696, the new church moved to Charleston, South Carolina at least partly because of disagreements between the Rev. Mr. Screven and the New England Baptist authorities. According to family tradition, however, Screven and his band of ten followers were escorted to the edge of town by the local Puritans and told to leave and never return, on pain of hanging.

The relocated congregation became the First Baptist Church of Charleston, South Carolina, the oldest Baptist church in the South and one of the oldest in the United States. The Rev. Mr. Screven recommended that any future pastor be "orthodox in faith, and of blameless life, and does own the confession of faith put forth by our brethren in London in 1689" declaring the church to be firmly Calvinist (Reformed Baptist). The Rev. Mr. Screven died in 1713 and was buried on his personal property. The inscription on his grave reads as follows:

"A pioneer Baptist Preacher of Sommerton, England, immigrated to Kittery, Maine, forced to leave that state for preaching the gospel, came south with a group of Baptists, organized the First Baptist Church in the South 1693, at Charleston, and served First Baptist there until 1706. Died in 1713 and buried in private yard at Georgetown, S.C. A servant of Christ, Pure in Morals, Sound in Doctrine, Abundant in Labors."

The Screven Baptist Association, founded in 1950, is named for him.  This group is an umbrella group for churches in Dorchester, Berkeley, and eastern Orangeburg Counties.

See also 

Southern Baptist Convention
Charleston, South Carolina
Baptists in the United States

Notes

External links
A History of the Baptists. Chapter 6: The Baptists of Maine and South Carolina
Google Book Search: The South Carolina Historical and Genealogical Magazine
Historical Marker Database Cemetery Inscription (Not Rev. Screven's grave marker)
First Baptist Church of Charleston, South Carolina
The Screven Baptist Association (Named for Rev. William Screven)

Clergy from Charleston, South Carolina
1629 births
1713 deaths
17th-century Baptist ministers from the United States
18th-century Baptist ministers from the United States
South Carolina colonial people
English emigrants